Idiomysis is a genus of small mysids found in warm, shallow waters of Indian Ocean (including Red Sea) and Pacific.

Anatomy
Mysids from the genus Idiomysis are just few millimeters length; their cephalothorax is gibbous and robust whereas the abdomen is characteristically curled up behind. When compared with other mysids, Idiomysis has short antennae, relatively big eyes and small, usually unarmed telson, however a single species, I. diadema, possesses a pair of short terminal spines.

Systematics

There are six species described so far in the genus:
 Idiomysis diadema Wittmann, 2016
 Idiomysis inermis W. Tattersall, 1922
 Idiomysis japonica Murano, 1978
 Idiomysis mozambica Deprez, Wooldridge & Mees, 2001
 Idiomysis robusta Connell, 2008
 Idiomysis tsurnamali Bacescu, 1973.

Ecology
Idiomysis live in the small groups (called swarms) of 5 to more than 40 individuals, which hover over sea bottom during a day and probably feed on the seafloor on the nighttime. All known species are found in the shallow coastal waters, however they inhabit different niches and can be found on coral reefs, seaweeds, rocks or sandy bottoms. Two species – I. inermis and I. tsurnamali – are known for commensal relationship with the sea anemones, whereas I. diadema is associated with the sea urchin Diadema. There are also reports of Idiomysis hovering above upside-down jellyfish, Cassiopea. Possibly mysids gain protection and/or food supply from this relationship, however the exact nature of the relation has not been studied.

Distribution
The described species are known from Red Sea (I. diadema and I. tsurnamali), Mozambique Channel (I. mozambica), Gulf of Mannar (I. inermis), western coast of Australia (I. inermis), East China Sea (I. japonica) and western coast of South Africa (I. robusta).

References

External links
 Movies of swarming Idiomysis on realmonstrosities.com.

Mysida